The 2015 Critérium du Dauphiné was the 67th edition of the Critérium du Dauphiné cycling stage race. The eight-stage race in France began in Ugine on 7 June and concluded in Modane Valfréjus on 14 June, and was the sixteenth of the twenty-eight races in the 2015 UCI World Tour season. The Dauphiné was viewed as a preview for July's Tour de France and a number of the contenders for the general classification of the Tour participated in the race.

The first leader of the general classification was 's Peter Kennaugh, who won the opening stage. He lost the race lead to  rider Rohan Dennis, whose team won stage three's team time trial. His teammate Tejay van Garderen then took over after the race's first mountain stage, stage five. Vincenzo Nibali of the  team took the lead after stage six, before van Garderen regained it following stage. Chris Froome, who was second to van Garderen after the penultimate stage, claimed the race victory with his win on the final stage. Van Garderen finished second overall, ten seconds in arrears, with 's Rui Costa third, a further one minute and six seconds down.

In the race's other classifications, Nacer Bouhanni won the sprinter's points classification. The mountains classification was won by 's Daniel Teklehaimanot, who achieved it by getting in the early breakaways and placing highly over categorised climbs. Simon Yates of  won the young rider classification as the best rider born after 1 January 1990.

Teams 

As the Critérium du Dauphiné was a UCI World Tour event, all seventeen UCI WorldTeams were invited automatically and obligated to send a squad. Four second-tier UCI Professional Continental teams were given wildcard invitations, forming the race's 21-team peloton. The number of riders allowed per squad was eight, therefore the start list contained a total of 168 riders.

The teams entering the race were:

Pre-race favourites 

Former winners of the general classification named in the start list were 2008 and 2009 winner Alejandro Valverde, 2013 winner Chris Froome and 2014 winner Andrew Talansky. The leading contenders for general classification were two of the four Tour de France favourites, Froome and Vincenzo Nibali. Both winners of the previous two Tours, they were thought to have planned to use the Dauphiné's likeness to Tour's mountainous route as preparation. The riders considered outsiders included Talansky, Valverde, Joaquim Rodríguez, Tejay van Garderen, Rui Costa, Romain Bardet, Bauke Mollema and the winner of the young rider classification in 2014, Wilco Kelderman.

Route 

On 2 April 2015, the organiser of the race, Amaury Sport Organisation (ASO), announced the route of the 2015 Critérium du Dauphiné at a presentation in Lyon, France. The eight-stage race in the Dauphiné region of France was held from 7–14 June, and was seen as a preview for the Alpine stages in the Tour de France, which took place the following month. The race opened with a  hilly circuit stage around Albertville. The third stage was a team time trial, the first since the 1980 edition. The  route from Roanne to Montagny was described by Stephen Farrand of Cyclingnews.com as rolling and could "seriously influence" the general classification. The fifth stage covered the same distance and course as stage seventeen in the Tour de France. It featured the Col d'Allos mountain pass and ended with a summit finish at the Pra-Loup ski resort. Stage six took the race north, with the  route from Saint-Bonnet-en-Champsaur to Villard-de-Lans including six climbs. The penultimate stage was another mountainous stage that featured the Col de la Croix Fry and Col des Aravis climbs before a final accent to Saint-Gervais-les-Bains. The final stage took in the Lacets de Montvernier before moving through the Maurienne valley to the finish at Modane Valfréjus.

Stages

Stage 1 

7 June 2015 — Ugine to Albertville, 

The route left Ugine and passed the finishing city of Albertville, before a loop that featured the category 4 Côte d'Esserts-Blay,  in. On the return to Albertville the riders crossed the finish line for the first time for a  lap. As the race crossed the finish line for the second time, a shorter  circuit was undertaken five times, with the primary difference being the exclusion of the Côte du Cruet.

After , a breakaway was formed by Romain Guillemois, Björn Thurau, Daniel Teklehaimanot and Maarten Wynants. Their advantage over the peloton increased to over four minutes at the  mark, which moved up to a maximum of around seven minutes twenty seconds. Teklehaimanot accrued enough mountains classification points to secure the polka dot jersey with two climbs of the Côte du Villard to go.

Thurau attacked Teklehaimanot on the last passing of the Villard, which led to an attack by Daniel Oss from the chasing peloton. With  remaining, four more riders joined Oss and the group caught Thurau in the final , with the six-rider group holding a margin of twelve seconds. Peter Kennaugh of  attacked from the group with  remaining and took the stage victory two seconds ahead of the bunch sprint. Kennaugh's first place gave him a ten-second time bonus in the general classification; he also took the lead of the points classification and Sky topped the team classification. Tiesj Benoot of  became the first leader of the young rider classification.

Stage 2 

8 June 2015 —  Le Bourget-du-Lac to Villars-les-Dombes, 

Stage two's  course was the flattest of the race. The stage left the start at Le Bourget-du-Lac and within  crossed the second-category . The route then followed a  descent that included three uncategorised climbs. The final  to the finish in Villars-les-Dombes were flat.

The early breakaway was formed by three riders, Perrig Quéméneur, Arnaud Courteille and, for the second day running, Daniel Teklehaimanot. Teklehaimanot took the maximum points over the Col du Chat. The trio were under seven minutes ahead of the peloton at the foot of the Col de Cuvery. Teklehaimanot again took the points at the top, where the lead had dropped to over a minute.

A crash in the peloton with  remaining left a group of riders chasing to the back of the main group, including pre-race favourite Joaquim Rodríguez. The breakaway was caught with  remaining. In the final kilometre, the  team controlled the front before leading out their sprinter, Edvald Boasson Hagen. His move was made too early and he was overtaken by three other riders, with Nacer Bouhanni crossing the finish line first. Third-placed Sacha Modolo took the lead of the points classification, with Bouhanni becoming the best young rider.

Stage 3 

9 June 2015 — Roanne to Montagny, team time trial (TTT)

A gradual incline took the stage to its finish.

 were the first team to set a time, with 31' 31". They were soon displaced by the third team to start , the team time trial world champions, who set a time of 29' 58".  then came in with a four-second deficit to BMC and placed second.  were next recording a time of 30' 16", which put them third.

, who placed sixth, lost their lead of the team classification to stage winners BMC. Although BMC's highest placed rider in the general classification was Manuel Quinziato, he was not one of the five riders required to finish; the highest of the five was Rohan Dennis, who became the new leader in both the general and young rider classifications. Second placed overall Tejay van Garderen, who was BMC's general classification leader and a pre-race favourite praised his team's effort and was confident about his chances in the race, saying "I feel good. This was the first big test of the Dauphiné, and going into the mountains I feel ready to put up a good challenge." Nacer Bouhanni moved into the lead of the points classification as Sacha Modolo failed to start.

Stage 4 

10 June 2015 — Anneyron  to Sisteron, 

A short descent led to the foot of the fourth-category Col de Pre-Guittard, the stage's highest point. A similarly sized uncategorised climb followed. A series of small climbs then took the stage to the flat finish at Sisteron.

A breakaway duo consisting of Martijn Keizer and Tosh Van der Sande escaped  into the stage. Their lead was six minutes and thirty seconds after they had passed the Lescou and Pre-Guittard climbs. At the foot of the Côte de la Marquise, the pair had a one-minute advantage. Van der Sande was dropped on the climb and Keizer led over the summit with margin of twenty seconds. Attacks from the peloton on the descent saw the formation of a group consisting of Cyril Gautier, Tim Wellens, Lawson Craddock and Wilco Kelderman. Wellens attacked and then passed Keizer.

Wellens was caught by the peloton in the final , before a failed move by a trio consisting of Daniel Oss, Tony Martin and Bram Tankink. Tony Gallopin launched a late attack, but was caught during the bunch sprint that was won by Nacer Bouhanni, his second stage victory of the race. There were no changes to the classifications.

Stage 5 

11 June 2015 — Digne-les-Bains to Pra-Loup, 

After a descent and small rise a came another third-category climb, the Col de Toutes Aures.

Mountains classification leader Daniel Teklehaimanot was the first to initiate the early seven-rider breakaway; the other riders were Christophe Riblon, Tim Wellens, Pieter Serry, Romain Sicard, Arnaud Courteille, and Albert Timmer (both ). Courteille claimed the points at the Col des Lèques, with Teklehaimanot second, with the aforementioned first over the Col de Toutes Aures and Col de la Colle-Saint-Michel.  set a high pace at the head of the peloton throughout the Col d'Allos, leading to a large number of riders being dropped, including the race leader Rohan Dennis. In the breakaway, an attack by Serry dropped Riblon, Teklehaimanot, and Courteille. Before the summit of the climb, with  remaining, the break was caught.

As the race reached the summit, Romain Bardet attacked, and the bottom had gained a twenty-second advantage over the front group of around thirty riders, increasing it to one minute at the foot of the Pra-Loup climb. Sky again controlled the head of the chase, with Vincenzo Nibali, Alejandro Valverde and Wilco Kelderman the notable riders distanced. Chris Froome launched an attack in the final , with Tejay van Garderen and Beñat Intxausti following. Van Garderen dropped Intxausti and passed Froome to take second place, thirty-six seconds behind stage winner Bardet. The new leaders in the classifications were van Garderen in the general, Bardet in the young riders' and Sky in the team standings.

Stage 6 

12 June 2015 — Saint-Bonnet-en-Champsaur to Villard-de-Lans, 

The sixth stage from Saint-Bonnet-en-Champsaur to Villard-de-Lans moved the race into the high mountains with six categorised climbs. The opening third of the route crossed hilly terrain that featured two third-category climbs, the Rampe du Motty and the Côte du Barrage de Sautet. The riders traversed the second-category Col de la Croix Haute at the  mark, before a short descent and a further rise to the third-category Col de Grimone. After a long descent and short rise, the race came to the foot of the first-category . At the summit with  remaining, the day's highest point, the riders dropped down to the final hills before the summit finish at the third-category climb to Villard-de-Lans.

Early in the wet stage, a group of nine riders broke away, only to be pulled back the peloton, with a second group of nineteen also failing. An unsuccessful move from Tony Martin was followed by an attack by Vincenzo Nibali over the Col de Grimone and the formation of an elite five-strong group on descent with Rui Costa, Alejandro Valverde, and Tony Gallopin. This attack reduced the main group of chasers and caused the abandonment of several riders. The advantage of the break was over three minutes as they climbed the Col de Rousset, with Nibali briefly escaping on the subsequent descent.

Martin was dropped with  remaining, with the advantage at over two minutes. In the chasing main group, Simon Yates and Dan Martin moved clear. Costa was able to pull both back ahead and passed them to take the stage win. Nibali took over the lead of the general classification, with a margin of twenty-nine seconds over Costa.  moved into the lead of the team classification.

Stage 7 

13 June 2015 — Montmélian to Saint-Gervais-les-Bains, 

Stage seven was the queen stage of the race, with five first-category climbs and the third-category Col des Aravis. It was the shortest in length of the three mountain stages. The initial  were flat apart from one small climb. The riders then began the climb of the Col de Tamié, which was followed by the ascent of Col de la Forclaz. After a descent and a number of small hills, the Col de la Croix Fry was climbed. At the top a small drop and climb over the Col des Aravis took the riders to a descent and a long gradual incline. A further descent and flat section placed the race at the foot of the Côte des Amerand. After a small drop the stage concluded with the climb to Saint-Gervais-les-Bains.

Another wet stage saw a breakaway of thirty-five riders move away  in, which decreased to twenty-five on the Col de la Croix Fry. On the aforemetenioed climb,  reduced the size of the peloton and the advantage of the breakaway. Daniel Teklehaimanot took maximum points over the opening four climbs to secure the mountains classification. The Col des Aravis split the breakaway, and on the descent, an attack out of the eighteen-strong leading group by Daniel Navarro and Riccardo Zoidl gained a lead of three minutes. The peloton fractured on the Côte des Amerands, with race leader Vincenzo Nibali being dropped.

At the start of the final climb, the leading duo were joined by Jonathan Castroviejo and Bartosz Huzarski. With  remaining, Froome attacked to win the stage by a margin of seventeen seconds. Van Garderen moved into the lead of the general classification, and although placing second in the stage, he was content, saying "My tactic was just to mark Froome and when he went there was no way I could follow him, but I'm very happy with the yellow jersey."

Stage 8 

14 June 2015 — Saint-Gervais-les-Bains to Modane Valfréjus, 

The final stage of the race left from the location of the previous stage's finish, Saint-Gervais-les-Bains, for a  route. After the riders climbed a  rise from the start, they went down a long descent with the second-category Côte d'Héry-sur-Ugine in the middle. The terrain remained flat until the fourth-category Côte d'Aiton,  in. This was followed by the third-category Côte de Saint-Georges-d'Hurtières. A further flat section placed the riders at the foot of the first-category Lacets de Montvernier. After the subsequent descent began a long gradual incline to the climb of the third-category Côte de Saint-André.

Wilco Kelderman's move in the opening  initiated a breakaway of thirteen riders. Tony Martin attacked from the break on the Côte de Saint-Georges-d'Hurtières and at the foot of the Lacets de Montvernier he had an advantage of one-and-a-half minutes over them and around four over the peloton. The last of the riders from the break caught Martin on the Côte de Saint-André, where Steve Cummings of  attacked this front group.

Cummings' lead over the peloton at the foot of the final climb was one minute and twenty seconds. With  remaining, Vincenzo Nibali moved to the front in support of  teammate Michele Scarponi, whose failed attack led to the formation of an elite group of chasers including the general classification leaders. Chris Froome was the only rider to have the support of a teammate, Wout Poels, who rode on the front until Froome attacked as they caught Cummings. At first Tejay van Garderen could follow this move, but he was eventually unable to keep up with Froome and was caught by Simon Yates and Rui Costa. Froome took the stage victory, eighteen seconds ahead of the three behind, and finished the race as the winner of the general classification.

Classification leadership 

In the Critérium du Dauphiné, four different jerseys were awarded. The most important was the general classification, which was calculated by adding each rider's finishing times on each stage. The rider with the least accumulated time is the race leader, identified by a yellow jersey with a blue bar; the winner of this classification was considered the winner of the race.

Additionally, there was a points classification, which awarded a green jersey. In the classification, cyclists received points for finishing in the top 10 in a stage. For stages, 1, 2 and 4 the win earned 25 points, second place 22, third 20, fourth 18, fifth 16, sixth 14, seventh 12, eighth 10, ninth 8 and tenth 6. For stages 5, 6, 7 and 8 the win earned 15 points, second place 12, third 10, fourth 8, fifth 6, and 1 point fewer per place down to a single point for 10th. Points towards the classification could also be achieved at each of the intermediate sprints; these points were given to the top three riders through the line with 5 points for first, 3 for second, and 1 point for third.

There was also a mountains classification, the leadership of which was marked by a red jersey with white polka dots. In the mountains classification, points towards the classification were won by reaching the top of a climb before other cyclists. Each climb was categorised as either first, second, third, or fourth-category, with more points available for the higher-categorised climbs. First-category climbs awarded the most points; the first six riders were able to accrue points, compared with the first four on second-category climbs, the first two on third-category and only the first for fourth-category.

The fourth jersey represented the young rider classification, marked by a white jersey. This was decided the same way as the general classification, but only riders born on or after 1 January 1990 were eligible to be ranked in the classification. There was also a team classification, in which the times of the best three cyclists per team on each stage were added together; the leading team at the end of the race was the team with the lowest total time.

Final standings

General classification

Points classification

Mountains classification

Young rider classification

Team classification

References

External links 

 

2015
2015 UCI World Tour
2015 in French sport
June 2015 sports events in France